Fireman's Hall is a historic fire hall located at Alfred in Allegany County, New York.  It was built in 1890-1891 by volunteer firemen as the first home of the A.E. Crandall Hook & Ladder Co.  It is a massive three story brick and sandstone structure that features an imposing bell / clock tower. The clock, designed by Seth Thomas, was donated by the Samuel Stillman family after the Village ran out of funds for the hall. The weather vane atop depicts a firefighter on a ladder. The building has housed village offices since the 1970s, as well as village court, police station and meeting hall today.

It was listed on the National Register of Historic Places in 1980.

References

External links

Fire stations on the National Register of Historic Places in New York (state)
Fire stations completed in 1891
Buildings and structures in Allegany County, New York
1891 establishments in New York (state)
Defunct fire stations in New York (state)
National Register of Historic Places in Allegany County, New York